Nalassus convexus is a species of darkling beetles belonging to the subfamily Tenebrioninae.

These beetles can be found in Austria, Germany, Hungary and Switzerland.

References

Beetles described in 1850
Tenebrioninae
Beetles of Europe